The DTA J-RO is a French autogyro designed and produced by DTA sarl of Montélimar. The aircraft is supplied complete and ready-to-fly.

Design and development
The J-RO was designed to combine the advantages of an ultralight trike with an autogyro. As such it is a "Cabriolet" (convertible) design whereby the gull-winged doors are removable to allow open air flight in the summertime and an enclosed cockpit for cooler weather. The doors are a factory option and may be purchased and installed later.

The design features a single main rotor, a two-seats-in side-by-side configuration enclosed or open cockpit with a windshield, tricycle landing gear with wheel pants and a four-cylinder, liquid and air-cooled, four stroke  Rotax 912ULS or turbocharged  Rotax 914 engine in pusher configuration. It has a Kevlar belt-driven pre-rotator for the main rotor.

The aircraft fuselage is made from carbon fiber reinforced polymer.

In noise testing for acceptance in Switzerland the design produced 62.4 dB. The Swiss testing requires the design produce no more than a maximum of 65 dB for this class of aircraft.

Specifications (J-RO)

See also
List of rotorcraft

References

External links

J-RO
Single-engined pusher autogyros
2010s French sport aircraft